The Dutch Eredivisie in the 1977–78 season was contested by 18 teams. PSV won the championship and also won the UEFA Cup that season to complete a Double.

League standings

Results

See also
 1977–78 Eerste Divisie
 1977–78 KNVB Cup

References

 Eredivisie official website - info on all seasons 
 RSSSF

Eredivisie seasons
Netherlands
1